Disambiguation: "Masters of Entertainment may also refer to an educational degree, for example John Tarnoff's "Masters of Entertainment Technology" degree from the Entertainment Technology Center

Master of Entertainment (m.o.e.) is a Pony Canyon label responsible for production in various anime works. Their name is based on the term moe (slang) as they primarily produce "cute" anime.

Anime involved in producing
The Cosmopolitan Prayers
Hanaukyo Maid Team OAV and TV
Hit wo Nerae!
Love Love? (also planning)
Rizelmine
Steel Angel Kurumi 2 (TV)
Steel Angel Kurumi Pure (live-action TV)
Steel Angel Kurumi Zero (OAV)
Ultimate Girls (Original story)

See also
Imagin (studio)

External links
Official site on Pony Canyon
 

Pony Canyon
Anime companies